Gleb Vseslavich (died September 13, 1119) was the prince of Minsk between 1101 and 1119. During his reign Minsk was at war with Kiev and Polatsk. He started the Minsk branch of Prince of Polotsk as son of Vseslav the Seer.

In 1104 his city of Minsk was under siege from the voivode Putiata, Oleg Sviatoslavich, and Yaropolk Vladimirovich, the son of Vladimir II Monomakh. In 1106 he had partaken the raid on the Baltic tribe of Semigallians.

In 1116 he started the war with the Monomakh and burned down Slutsk. In response to that Monomakh with his sons, Davyd Sviatoslavich, and sons of Oleg Sviatoslavich assaulted Minsk. The Monomakhs took Orsha, Drutsk, and took Minsk under siege. Gleb started negotiations with Vladimir who in spirit of the upcoming Easter holidays agreed to conclude a peace. Completely ignoring the conditions of the signed peace treaty, Gleb resumed his hostilities in 1119. The same year Mstislav Vladimirovich, the son of Monomakh, took Gleb as a prisoner to Kiev where the last one died shortly.

Family
Wife: since 1090 Anastasia (died 1159), a daughter of Yaropolk Iziaslavovich
Sons:
Rostislav (died 1165), Prince of Minsk 1146–1165 and Prince of Polotsk 1151–1159
Volodar (died 1167+),  1146–1167, Prince of Minsk 1151–1159, 1165–1167, and Prince of Polotsk 1167
Vsevolod (died 1159/1162), Prince of Iziaslav 1151–1159, Prince of Strezhev 1159–1162
Iziaslav (died 1134)

References and sources
Alekseyev L. V. — Polotsk Land // Medieval Russian Principality 10th—13th centuries — published 1975

1119 deaths
Rurik dynasty
People from Polotsk
12th-century princes in Kievan Rus'
Eastern Orthodox monarchs
Year of birth unknown